Brussels Basketball, for sponsorship reasons known as Circus Brussels Basketball, is a professional basketball club based in Brussels, Belgium. The team plays in the BNXT League. Home games are played at the Sports Complex Neder-Over-Heembeek.

Founded as Excelsior Brussels in 1957, the team plays in the Neder-Over-Heembeek complex.

History
The club was founded in 1957. In 1999 Excelsior merged with AERA Castor and renamed itself AERA Excelsior Brussel VZW. After 7 years in the 3e Nationale, the Belgian third division, Excelsior promoted to the 2e Nationale in 2009. In the first two years, Excelsior finished 4th and 5th and was defeated in the quarterfinals. In the 2011–12 season Excelsior reached the semifinals and in the 2012–13 season, it finished 10th while missing the Playoffs.

The club moved to the professional Scooore League, the first tier in Belgium, for the 2013–14 season. Excelsior received a C-licence, which allowed them to play with a lower budget in the league. The club also got a new main sponsor in Basic-Fit, and was renamed Basic-Fit Brussels.

During the 2016–17 season, Brussels participated in a European competition for the first time by entering the 2016–17 FIBA Europe Cup season. Brussels finished fourth and last in Group A, winning one out of six games. Along with this, the club finished in the third place in the Belgian League and reached the Finals for the first time in club history by beating Antwerp Giants in the semi-finals.

On 2 July 2019, the club announced it changed its name to Phoenix Brussels, a name the club used for three seasons. From December 2020 to March 2021, Phoenix played its home games in the Palais 12. However, due to the COVID-19 pandemic, there were no people in attendance.

Since the 2021–22 season, Brussels plays in the BNXT League, in which the national leagues of Belgium and the Netherlands have been merged. On 17 June 2022, the club signed a sponsor agreement with Circus, leading to a name change; the club colours were also changed to red.  The team also signed Belgian national team player Kevin Tumba.

Sponsorship names 
 Excelsior Bruxelles: 1999–2013
 Basic-Fit Brussels: 2013–2019
 Phoenix Brussels: 2019–2022
 Circus Brussels Basketball: 2022–present

Arenas 
Upon the club's establishment in 1957, the team played outdoors on the field of the King Baudouin Stadium (then the Heysel Stadium). The current home arena of Brussels is the Sports complex Neder-Over-Heembeek.

In the late 2020–21 season, the team moved to the Palais 12 for all games from 12 March 2021.

Honours

Domestic competitions
Belgian League
 Runners-up (1): 2016–17

Season by season

Players

Current roster

Notable players

Head coaches
 Serge Crevecoeur
 Laurent Monier (February–March 2020)
  Ian Hanavan (September 2020–October 2021)
 Jean-Marc Jaumin (October 2021–present)

References

External links
Official website
Excelsior Brussels at Ethias League website

1957 establishments in Belgium
Basketball teams established in 1957
Basketball teams in Belgium
Pro Basketball League
Sport in Brussels